The Elora Mohawks are Junior "B" box lacrosse team from Elora, Ontario, Canada.  The Mohawks play in the OLA Junior B Lacrosse League.

History

Probably founded in the 1960s, the Mohawks started out as the Fergus Thistles.  In 1963, the team moved to become the Guelph Mohawks.  In 1967 the team moved to Elora, Ontario and won the Canadian Castrol Cup in that year.  They have bounced between the OLA Junior A Lacrosse League and the OLA Junior B Lacrosse League.

Fergus Thistles 19xx – 1962
Guelph Mohawks 1963 – 1966
Elora Mohawks 1967 to Present

2004 Playoff Run
The 2004 Season ended with the Mohawks tied for first place in the West with the Spartan Warriors with a 17–3–0 record.  Prior to the season, it was announced that the Mohawks were to also host the 2004 National Championship—the Founders Cup.  The Mohawks opened up the Playoffs against the 8th seed Windsor Fratmen.  The upstart Fratmen had barely squeezed past the Wallaceburg Red Devils into the last playoff spot and had stolen a big 8–7 victory from the Division leading Sarnia Pacers to even make the playoffs.  The series was a mismatch from the start—the Mohawks swept the Fratmen in three games.  The second round put them up against the Orangeville Northmen, which also resulted in a three-game sweep.  The Conference Final was against the Spartan Warriors, another easy three games.  This set up a League Final between the Mohawks and the Clarington Green Gaels.  In what had looked like a fourth straight possible sweep ended up going the distance.  Despite crushing the Gaels in 2 of the first three games by scores of 16–4 and 12–1, the Gaels came back to win 3 of the last four games and upset the Mohawks for the league title.

As host of the 2004 Founders Cup, the Elora Mohawks received an automatic berth into the tourney and received a chance at redemption for the Provincial Title loss.  The tourney started on August 21 with the Mohawks facing off against the Sherbrooke Jr. Extrême of Quebec.  What occurred was nothing short of a massacre—30–1 Mohawks.  Later that night, the Saskatoon Smash had received a similar demoralizing thrashing from the Mohawks, losing 27–5.  The next night the Mohawks defeated the Delta Islanders of British Columbia 16–2.  The night after, the Mohawks also beat the Calgary Mountaineers 11–4.  The Mohawks appeared to back to their normal selves.

The Semi-final was against the Edmonton Warriors, and the Mohawks enthused the home crowd with a 16–5 win.  The finals were to be played against the OLA Champion Clarington Green Gaels who were having an excellent tournament as well.  The Mohawks had their chance at redemption, to avenge the team that took away their chance at their fifth OLA Jr B league title.  The Finals did not go as planned for the again-favoured Mohawks.  The Gaels won 11–8.

2005 Playoff Run

After the disappointing 2004 Season, the Mohawks prepared for a rebuilding year.  With 13 rookies, the Mohawks finished the 2005 season with an 11–9–0 record.  The sixth-place finish pitted them against the Guelph Regals in the first round.  Despite the Regals seemingly having the better club, the Mohawks swept the series with three straight victories.  This upset prompted an immediate match up between the Mohawks and the first seed Spartan Warriors.  Despite an 18–2–0 record, the series went the distance and in game five the Mohawks pulled the ultimate upset defeating the heavily favoured Warriors 9–6.  In the Conference Final, the Mohawks then fought off the second seed Orangeville Northmen in 4 games to push into the league finals.  The Finals pitted the Mohawks against the 2005 Cinderella Story Oakville Buzz.  The Buzz were most lacrosse enthusiast's favourite to not only win the league, but to win the National title.  What no one counted on was the playoff suave that would be exhibited by the Elora Mohawks.  Elora went up 2 games to none quickly—9–7, 14–5.  With the threat of elimination, the Buzz came on strong in Game 3, winning 9–4.  But the Buzz could not stop the Mohawks, as the Elora squeaked out a 9–8 victory in Game 4 to win the OLA title and earn a birth into the Founders Cup tournament in Saskatoon, Saskatchewan.

On August 24, the Mohawks played their first game of their second straight Founders Cup tourney.  In the first game against the Coquitlam Adanacs of British Columbia, the Mohawks got the ball rolling with a 12–6 win.  The next night, the Mohawks beat the Sherwood Park Titans of Alberta 12–3.  The Playdown Round then began.  On August 26, the Mohawks defeated the Winnipeg Warhawks 13–2.  Later that night, they also defeated the Calgary Mountaineers 7–2.  The final Playdown game was against the Iroquois Lacrosse Association All-Stars, in which they defeated the ILA 14–3.

The victory against the ILA pushed the Mohawks through to the finals against the Edmonton Warriors.  The Warriors could not match the Mohawks determination as the Mohawks won their second Founders Cup Championship as the best Junior "B" Lacrosse team in Canada—one year after everyone figured it would have happened.

Season-by-season results

Note: GP = Games played, W = Wins, L = Losses, T = Ties, Pts = Points, GF = Goals for, GA = Goals against

Founders Cup
CANADIAN NATIONAL CHAMPIONSHIPS

External links
The Bible of Lacrosse
Unofficial OLA Page

Ontario Lacrosse Association teams
Centre Wellington